Terrance Jamar Gore (born June 8, 1991) is an American professional baseball outfielder who is a free agent. He played college baseball at Gulf Coast Community College. He made his MLB debut in 2014 with the Kansas City Royals and has also played in Major League Baseball (MLB) for the Chicago Cubs, Los Angeles Dodgers, Atlanta Braves and New York Mets.

Gore is regarded as one of the fastest players in baseball and is mainly used as a pinch runner. Gore is frequently added to expanded rosters on contending teams late in the season and was on the postseason roster of a championship team three times - the Royals in 2015, the Dodgers in 2020, and the Braves in 2021.

Amateur career
Originally from Macon, Georgia, Gore attended Jones County High School in Gray, Georgia, where he starred in baseball and football as a running back and wide receiver. During his senior year, Gore compiled over 1,000 rushing yards and averaged over nine yards per carry. During his four years playing baseball at the school, he stole 145 bases and hit .474 as a senior. Gore later attended Gulf Coast Community College in Panama City, Florida, turning down football scholarships from the University of Georgia and Georgia Tech. Gore spent one season at Gulf Coast, hitting .330 and had 51 steals in 54 attempts.

Professional career

Kansas City Royals
Gore was drafted by the Kansas City Royals in the 20th round of the 2011 Major League Baseball Draft out of Gulf Coast Community College.

During the 2014 season, Gore expressed a desire to quit baseball to his agent, Jay Witasick, as he was about to raise a family and was not progressing professionally as much as he would have liked. Royals special assistant Mike Sweeney also advised Gore against retirement, and, in early August, Gore was duly promoted to the Omaha Storm Chasers to focus on pinch-running and stealing bases. On August 31, 2014, Gore was promoted to the Royals. Gore became the 16th known player in Major League Baseball history to wear No. 0. He was the second Royal to wear the number after George Scott Jr. He was used primarily as a designated pinch runner.

Gore appeared on the 2015 ALDS and 2015 ALCS roster for the Royals, but not the World Series roster. Regardless, Gore received his first World Series ring.

He was non-tendered by the Royals on December 1, 2017, and signed a minor league contract with them the following day.

Chicago Cubs
On August 15, 2018, Gore was traded to the Chicago Cubs in exchange for cash considerations, and assigned to the Triple-A Iowa Cubs. He was promoted to the major leagues on September 1, 2018. On September 8, he recorded his first major league hit in the first game of a double header against the Washington Nationals pitcher Max Scherzer. He became a free agent after the 2018 season.

Return to Kansas City
On December 18, 2018, Gore signed a one-year contract to return to the Royals. He was designated for assignment on July 12, 2019 despite hitting .275 with 13 stolen bases.

New York Yankees
On July 17, 2019, Gore was traded to the New York Yankees for cash considerations. He was not added to the 40-man roster and was sent to the Yankees AAA affiliate. He became a free agent following the 2019 season.

Los Angeles Dodgers
On February 17, 2020, Gore signed a minor league contract with the Los Angeles Dodgers. On July 23, 2020, he was added to the opening day 30-man roster. Gore appeared in two games for the Dodgers, playing one inning as a defensive replacement in the outfield and also pinch running before he was designated for assignment on July 30. On September 30, 2020, Gore was added to the 28-man roster for the 2020 Wild Card Series matchup against the Milwaukee Brewers. He did not appear in either of the two games in that series but remained on the roster for the second round series against the San Diego Padres. Manager Dave Roberts said that Gore might not appear in the series "...but if that situation presents itself, to not have him on the roster would be pretty costly, in my opinion.". He did not play in any games in the postseason as he was left off the roster for the NLCS and the World Series. Despite being left off the NLCS and World Series rosters, Gore still received a ring following the Dodgers championship victory, the second in his career.

On October 31, 2020, Gore was outrighted off the 40-man roster. He became a free agent on November 2, 2020.

Atlanta Braves
On February 25, 2021, Gore signed a minor league contract with the Atlanta Braves organization. Playing in 2021 for the Gwinnett Stripers he batted .232/.361/.319 and stole 18 bases while being caught four times.

On October 8, 2021, Gore was announced as part of the Braves 26-man roster for the NLDS. In the NLDS series against the Milwaukee Brewers, he had one appearance as a pinch runner. He was removed from the National League Championship Series roster, and though he returned to the World Series roster, did not appear in any of the ensuing games. The Braves eventually won the 2021 World Series, giving the Braves their first title since 1995, and Gore his second in a row, and third in seven years. On November 6, 2021, Gore was outrighted off of the 40-man roster and elected free agency the next day.

New York Mets
On June 6, 2022, Gore signed a minor league deal with the New York Mets. He was selected to the active roster on August 31.

References

External links

1991 births
Living people
African-American baseball players
People from Lilburn, Georgia
Baseball players from Georgia (U.S. state)
Major League Baseball left fielders
Kansas City Royals players
Chicago Cubs players
Los Angeles Dodgers players
Atlanta Braves players
New York Mets players
Gulf Coast State Commodores baseball players
Arizona League Royals players
Burlington Royals players
Lexington Legends players
Wilmington Blue Rocks players
Northwest Arkansas Naturals players
Omaha Storm Chasers players
Iowa Cubs players
Scranton/Wilkes-Barre RailRiders players
Sportspeople from the Atlanta metropolitan area
21st-century African-American sportspeople
Florida Complex League Mets players